HMS Tactician was a British submarine of the third group of the T class. She was built as P314 by Vickers-Armstrongs, Barrow, and launched on 29 July 1942.

Service

Tactician served in the Mediterranean Sea and the Far East during her wartime career. Whilst operating against the Italians, she sank the Italian auxiliary patrol vessel V17/Pia and the Italian sailing vessel Bice.  She also torpedoed the Italian merchant vessel Rosandra off the coast of Albania; sinking her the following day.

On being transferred to the Pacific, commanded by Lt. Cdr. Anthony Collett, DSC, she continued to harass enemy shipping, sinking a small Japanese vessel and two Siamese sailing vessels before the end of the war. She took part in Operation Cockpit, where she rescued a downed US airman under fire.

A newsreel dated 1952 shows Tactician taking part in a military exercise in the Sea of Japan. In it, the submarine is seen diving.

Tactician survived the war and continued in service with the navy, finally being scrapped at Newport on 6 December 1963.

See also 
 List of submarines of the Royal Navy

References

 
 

 

British T-class submarines of the Royal Navy
Ships built in Barrow-in-Furness
1942 ships
World War II submarines of the United Kingdom
Cold War submarines of the United Kingdom